Miles_Gurtu is the fourth studio album by Robert Miles, the second he independently recorded and produced. The record was released on 10 February 2004. Robert Miles and Indian jazz percussionist Trilok Gurtu met while recording Miles's last solo album, Organik, where Gurtu played percussion on three of the tracks. The result of the current collaboration is a mix of both musicians' very disparate styles. Miles_Gurtu expanded Robert Miles's "new style" started in Organik (2001), this time in a much more jazzy way.

Track listing
"Golden Rust"  – 4:46
"Soul Driven"  – 5:03
"Wearing Masks"  – 2:04
"Tragedy : Comedy"  – 1:20
"Omen"  – 1:53
"Loom"  – 5:23
"Languages of Conscious Thought"  – 2:13
"Without a Doubt"  – 2:19
"Small World"  – 3:58
"Small World (reprise)"  – 0:35
"Inductive"  – 5:09
"The Big Picture"  – 5:21
"Xenon"  – 2:10

Personnel
Composed and improvised by Robert Miles and Trilok Gurtu.

 Musical
 Robert Miles – keyboards
 Trilok Gurtu – drums, percussions, tabla, vocals
 Nitin Sawhney – electric guitar, nylon strings guitar
 Paul Falloon – bass
 Jon Thorne – double bass
 Mike Patto – Rhodes piano, Minimoog
 Adrian Bradbury – cello
 Toshinori Kondo – trumpet
 The Urban Soul Orchestra – strings

 Technical
 Roberto Concina – composer, sound design, arranger, strings arrangements, engineer, producer
 Trilok Gurtu – background noise
 Stephen Hussey – string arrangements
 Toni Economides – engineer
 Michael Fossenkemper – mastering
 Matt Appleton – artwork

References

External links
 Profile of Miles_Gurtu at Robert-Miles.com

Robert Miles albums
Trilok Gurtu albums
Jazz albums by Swiss artists
2004 albums
Articles with underscores in the title